Leisure City is an unincorporated community and census-designated place (CDP) in Miami-Dade County, Florida, United States, that includes the smaller, older community of Modello in its northwestern section. The population was 26,324 at the 2020 census, up from 22,655 in 2010. It is most notable for the Coral Castle Museum, located in the Modello area.

Geography
It is bordered to the south and east by the city of Homestead and to the north by unincorporated Naranja. Unincorporated Redland is to the northwest.

U.S. Route 1 runs along the northwest edge of the community, leading south into Homestead and northeast to Miami. The Homestead Extension of Florida's Turnpike runs along the Homestead city line at the southeast edge of the community, with access from Exit 2 (SW 157th Avenue) just south of Leisure City and from Exit 5 (SW 288th Street) at the community's eastern edge.

Demographics

2020 census

As of the 2020 United States census, there were 26,324 people, 6,851 households, and 5,563 families residing in the CDP.

2000 census
At the 2000 census, there were 22,152 people, 6,063 households and 5,044 families residing in the CDP. The racial makeup of the CDP was 65.03% White (15.2% were Non-Hispanic Whites,) 18.00% African American, 0.20% Native American, 0.84% Asian, 0.03% Pacific Islander, 11.42% from other races, and 4.48% from two or more races. Hispanic or Latino of any race were 65.30% of the population.

There were 6,063 households, of which 50.1% had children under the age of 18 living with them, 54.7% were married couples living together, 21.0% had a female householder with no husband present, and 16.8% were non-families. 12.7% of all households were made up of individuals, and 4.3% had someone living alone who was 65 years of age or older. The average household size was 3.65 and the average family size was 3.94.

36.2% of the population were under the age of 18, 10.9% from 18 to 24, 30.1% from 25 to 44, 16.5% from 45 to 64, and 6.3% who were 65 years of age or older. The median age was 27 years. For every 100 females, there were 101.5 males. For every 100 females age 18 and over, there were 98.1 males.

The median household income was $29,091 and the median family income was $29,277. Males had a median income of $22,320 and females $18,619. The per capita income was $9,966. About 22.4% of families and 25.0% of the population were below the poverty line, including 33.3% of those under age 18 and 18.3% of those age 65 or over.

In 2000, speakers of Spanish as a first language accounted for 64.83% of residents, while English made up 31.02%, French Creole was at 4.01%, and Tagalog was the mother tongue of 0.12% of the population.

Education
Leisure City is a part of the Miami-Dade County Public Schools system and has three schools: Leisure City K-8, Homestead High School and South Dade High School.

Climate
The Köppen Climate Classification sub-type for this climate is "Aw" (Tropical Savanna Climate).

References

Census-designated places in Miami-Dade County, Florida
Census-designated places in Florida